Lazar Mitrović may refer to:

Lazar Mitrović (footballer, born 1993), Serbian association football player who plays for FK BSK Borča
Lazar Mitrović (footballer, born 1998), Serbian association football player who plays for FK Radnički Niš